Record Breakers was a British children's TV show, themed around world records and produced by the BBC. It was broadcast on BBC1 from 15 December 1972 to 21 December 2001.

It was originally presented by Roy Castle with Guinness World Records founders twin brothers Norris McWhirter and Ross McWhirter. The programme was a spin-off series from Blue Peter which had featured record breaking attempts overseen by the McWhirter twins. The closing theme was "Dedication", performed by Roy Castle, who broke nine world records on the show himself. Producers of the series over the years were, Alan Russell (its creator), Michael Forte, Eric Rowan, Greg Childs, Annette Williams and Jeremy Daldry.

As well as interviews with people who held British or World records, early editions of the programme would include a feature in which the studio audience would test the McWhirter brothers on their (almost infallible) knowledge of records, and the climax of each show would usually be a world record attempt in the studio. Ross was murdered by a Provisional IRA gunman in 1975, but his brother continued to appear on the show in the "Norris on the Spot" feature.

By the time Record Breakers was cancelled, it had been on air for 29 years, 7 days and was one of the longest-running TV programmes in Britain.

Hosts 
Other hosts included Dilys Morgan (1973), Fiona Kennedy (1983–86), Julian Farino (1985–86), Mark Curry (1995) and Ronald Reagan Jr. (1996–97). After Castle died in 1994, the show was hosted by Baker and Akabusi, then Linford Christie took over in 1998 with co-presenters Jack Lattimer, Jez Edwards (1998–2001), Kate Gerbeau (1998) and Sally Gray (1999–2000). Fearne Cotton was the host for the final series in 2001 with Edwards and Shovell.

Specials 
All Star Record Breakers, which ran annually from 1974 to 1982, was a special Christmas edition of the show. Castle was joined for this extended edition by virtually all the BBC's children's TV presenters for music and dance numbers, which generally culminated with the ensemble cast performing a classic story.

Transmission guide

Original series

All Star Record Breakers

Specials

Record Breakers Gold

See also
 Guinness World Records Smashed

References

External links
British Film Institute Screen Online

1972 British television series debuts
2001 British television series endings
1970s British children's television series
1980s British children's television series
1990s British children's television series
2000s British children's television series
BBC children's television shows
BBC reality television shows
British reality television series
English-language television shows
Guinness World Records